The Federation of Labour (Ireland) was a small nationalist political party in Northern Ireland.

It was founded in 1944 by much of the Belfast West branch of the Northern Ireland Labour Party (NILP), opposed to that group's acceptance of the partition of Ireland and movement towards unionism.

The party was led by James Collins, and from 1945 by Jack Beattie, the Member of Parliament for Belfast West, who had initially been elected for the NILP, but had since become an independent Labour representative.

The group stood in the 1945 Northern Ireland general election, but failed to see any of its candidates elected.  In 1949, it merged into the newly formed Northern Section of the Irish Labour Party.

References
Peter Barberis, John McHugh and Mike Tyldesley, Encyclopedia of British and Irish Political Organizations
Michael Stenton and Stephen Lees, Who's Who of British MPs: Volume IV, 1945-1979

Defunct political parties in Northern Ireland
Political parties established in 1944
Political parties disestablished in 1949